Bryan McDonald Jr. House is a historic home located at Troutville, Botetourt County, Virginia. It was built about 1766, and is a two-story, three-bay, side-gable, Georgian Period stone building with a two-story brick ell added about 1840.  Also attached is a modern, two-story frame addition.  The front facade is of coursed sandstone blocks and side and rear elevations of limestone. Also on the property are the contributing remains of a rectangular stone barn (c. 1770).

It was listed on the National Register of Historic Places in 2011.

References

Houses on the National Register of Historic Places in Virginia
Houses completed in 1766
Houses in Botetourt County, Virginia
National Register of Historic Places in Botetourt County, Virginia
1766 establishments in the Thirteen Colonies